Eva Schlotheuber (born 25 October 1959 in Osnabrück) is a German historian of Christianity in the Middle Ages.

Education and career
Eva Schlotheuber studied at the universities of Göttingen and Copenhagen. In 1994, she received her doctorate in Göttingen with a dissertation entitled Die Franziskaner in Göttingen. Die Geschichte des Klosters und seiner Bibliothek (The Franciscans in Göttingen. The history of the monastery and its library), supervised by Hartmut Hoffmann. From 1999 to 2001, she was a research assistant to Claudia Märtl at the Technical University of Braunschweig, and then in 2001, at the Ludwig Maximilian University of Munich (LMU). In 2003, she completed her habilitation there with a thesis on the life of nuns in the late Middle Ages.

In 2003, she was senior assistant at the LMU Munich and held professorships in Braunschweig and Marburg. From 2007 to 2010 Schlotheuber taught as Professor of Medieval History and auxiliary sciences at the University of Münster.

Since 2014, she has been a full member of the Zentraldirektion (central management) of the Monumenta Germaniae Historica and since 2016 a member of the Konstanzer Arbeitskreis für Mittelalterliche Geschichte.

In 2020, she was elected to the American Philosophical Society.

Research
Her research focuses on the history of education and libraries, cultural history, the history of religious orders, especially forms of life and expression in the medieval nunneries as well as the material culture of the Middle Ages, the portrayal of personality in the biographical and autobiographical literature of the High and Late Middle Ages and the conception of Emperor Charles IV's rule as well as the political structures and cultural currents of the 14th century. In autumn 2017, Schlotheuber and  organized a Reichenau conference of the Konstanzer Arbeitskreises für mittelalterliche Geschichte with the theme Zwischen Klausur und Welt. Autonomie und Interaktion spätmittelalterlicher geistlicher Frauengemeinschaften (Between enclosure and the outside. Autonomy and Interaction of Late Medieval Spiritual Women's Communities). Since 2016, she is Director (with Henrike Lähnemann) on a  funded project "The Nuns' Network" to edit the letter books from Lüne Abbey, largest medieval corpus of letters written by women.

Publications

Monographies
together with Jeffrey Hamburger, Margot Fassler, Susan Marti: Liturgical Life and Latin Learning at Paradies bei Soest, 1300–1425. Inscription and Illumination in the Choir Books of a North German Dominican Convent. 2 vols., Aschendorff, Münster 2017, .
together with Patrizia Carmassi and Almut Breitenbach: Schriftkultur und religiöse Zentren im norddeutschen Raum Wolfenbütteler Mittelalter-Studien 24. Wiesbaden: Harrassowitz, 2014.
Klostereintritt und Bildung. Die Lebenswelt der Nonnen im späten Mittelalter. Mit einer Edition des 'Konventstagebuchs' einer Zisterzienserin von Heilig-Kreuz bei Braunschweig (1484–1507). Mohr Siebeck, Tübingen 2004, .
Die Franziskaner in Göttingen. Die Geschichte des Klosters und seiner Bibliothek. Dietrich-Coelde-Verlag, Werl 1996, .

As editor
together with Jeffrey Hamburger: The Liber ordinarius of Nivelles. Liturgy as Interdisciplinary Intersection (Spätmittelalter, Humanismus, Reformation 111). Mohr Siebeck, Tübingen 2020, .
together with : Soziale Bindungen und gesellschaftliche Strukturen im späten Mittelalter (14.–16. Jahrhundert). Vandenhoeck & Ruprecht, Göttingen 2013, .
together with Hubertus Seibert: Böhmen und das Deutsche Reich. Ideen- und Kulturtransfer im Vergleich (13.–16. Jahrhundert). München 2009, 
Nonnen, Kanonissen und Mystikerinnen. Religiöse Frauengemeinschaften in Süddeutschland. Beiträge zur interdisziplinären Tagung vom 21. bis 23. September 2005 in Frauenchiemsee. Vandenhoeck & Ruprecht, Göttingen 2008, .

Digital projects
together with Henrike Lähnemann, Simone Schultz-Balluff, Edmund Wareham, Philipp Trettin, Lena Vosding und Philipp Stenzig: Netzwerke der Nonnen. Edition und Erschließung der Briefsammlung aus Kloster Lüne (ca. 1460–1555). In: Wolfenbütteler Digitale Editionen. Wolfenbüttel 2016–, online.

References

External links 
 Webpage about Eva Schlotheuber at the University of Münster
 Webpage about Eva Schlotheuber at the University of Düsseldorf
 Das Bücherinventar der Elisabeth von Calenberg: Edition und Anmerkungen (The book inventory of Elisabeth von Calenberg: edition and notes). Herzog August Bibliothek, Wolfenbüttel 2011, ed. Eva Schlotheuber and 

German medievalists
Academic staff of the University of Münster
Academic staff of Heinrich Heine University Düsseldorf
German women historians
1959 births
German women non-fiction writers
20th-century German non-fiction writers
20th-century German historians
20th-century German women writers
21st-century German non-fiction writers
21st-century German historians
21st-century German women writers
Living people
Members of the American Philosophical Society